Dmytro Mykolayovych Topchiyev (born 25 September 1966) is a retired Ukrainian professional footballer.

He made his professional debut playing at the Ural region in 1984 for FC Uralets Nizhny Tagil and later in 1987 when he debuted in the 1987 Soviet First League for FC Geolog Tyumen.

In 1988 Topchiyev returned to Ukraine, at first in Zaporizhia before joining his hometown club FC Kolos Nikopol.

At the top level Topchiyev debuted already debuted following dissolution of the Soviet Union in 1992 playing in western Ukraine for FC Volyn Lutsk and FC Karpaty Lviv before finally joining FC Dynamo Kyiv in 1993.

Honours
 Ukrainian Premier League champion: 1993.
 Ukrainian Cup winner: 1994.

References

External links

1966 births
Living people
Soviet footballers
Ukrainian footballers
Ukraine international footballers
Ukrainian expatriate footballers
Expatriate footballers in Russia
Expatriate footballers in Kazakhstan
FC Tyumen players
FC Torpedo Zaporizhzhia players
FC Arsenal Kyiv players
FC Elektrometalurh-NZF Nikopol players
FC Volyn Lutsk players
FC Karpaty Lviv players
FC Dynamo Kyiv players
FC Dnipro players
FC Zirka Kropyvnytskyi players
FC Ural Yekaterinburg players
PFC Spartak Nalchik players
FC Metalurh Zaporizhzhia players
FC Baltika Kaliningrad players
FC Aktobe players
Ukrainian Premier League players
Association football midfielders
FC Uralets Nizhny Tagil players
People from Nikopol, Ukraine